Thor Myklebust (30 June 1908 – 11 January 1989) was a Norwegian politician for the Liberal Party and later the Liberal People's Party.

He was elected to the Norwegian Parliament from Hordaland in 1965, and was re-elected on one occasion. During his second term, in December 1972, Myklebust joined the Liberal People's Party which split from the Liberal Party over disagreements of Norway's proposed entry to the European Economic Community. He had previously served in the position of deputy representative during the terms 1954–1957 and 1961–1965, and later served in the same position during the term 1973–1977.

Myklebust was born in Kvinnherad and held various positions in Kvinnherad municipality council from 1945 to 1963.

References

1908 births
1989 deaths
Liberal Party (Norway) politicians
Members of the Storting
20th-century Norwegian politicians
People from Kvinnherad